Marion O'Brien  is an Australian Paralympic table tennis player and athlete. At the 1964 Tokyo Games, she won a gold medal in the women's doubles C event with Daphne Ceeney, a silver medal in the women's javelin C event, and a bronze medal in the women's singles C event. At the 1968 Tel Aviv Games, she won a silver medal in the women's doubles C event with Elaine Schreiber, and a bronze medal in the women's slalom C event.

References

Year of birth missing (living people)
Australian female javelin throwers
Australian female table tennis players
Athletes (track and field) at the 1964 Summer Paralympics
Athletes (track and field) at the 1968 Summer Paralympics
Paralympic athletes of Australia
Table tennis players at the 1964 Summer Paralympics
Table tennis players at the 1968 Summer Paralympics
Paralympic table tennis players of Australia
Medalists at the 1964 Summer Paralympics
Medalists at the 1968 Summer Paralympics
Paralympic medalists in athletics (track and field)
Paralympic medalists in table tennis
Paralympic gold medalists for Australia
Paralympic silver medalists for Australia
Paralympic bronze medalists for Australia
Wheelchair category Paralympic competitors
Living people